Fabara or Favara de Matarranya is a municipality located in the province of Zaragoza, Aragon, Spain. According to the 2004 census (INE), the municipality has a population of 1,195 inhabitants.  This town is located in La Franja, the local dialect is a variant of Catalan.

There is a Roman mausoleum in this town, as well as important archaeological sites close by.

See also
Bajo Aragón-Caspe/Baix Aragó-Casp
La Franja

References

External links 

Official site

Municipalities in the Province of Zaragoza